Pulgunbyol Station is a station on Chŏllima Line of the Pyongyang Metro.

The station is a short walk to Mansudae Hill Grand Monument, Sungryong Hall and Three Revolutions Exhibit.

References

External links
 

Railway stations opened in 1973
Pyongyang Metro stations
1973 establishments in North Korea